The Cromwell Gorge is a deep gorge on the Clutha River in the Otago region of New Zealand's South Island. It stretches for 20 km south of the town of Cromwell towards Alexandra. It is one of three substantial river gorges in Central Otago, the others being the Kawarau Gorge to the west of Cromwell, and the Roxburgh Gorge downstream from Alexandra.

Long associated with the production of stone fruit, the gorge — and also part of Cromwell — was substantially drowned in the 1990s by the creation of Lake Dunstan behind the hydroelectric Clyde Dam.  The Otago Central Railway which used to run to Cromwell was stopped at Clyde and State Highway 8 was re-routed above the new lake.

The Dunstan Trail, a major new cycle route, was opened on the river's right bank in 2021.

See also
Kawarau Gorge

References

Canyons and gorges of Otago
Clutha River
Cromwell, New Zealand